= Aisha Ibrahim Dankani =

Nigerian politician

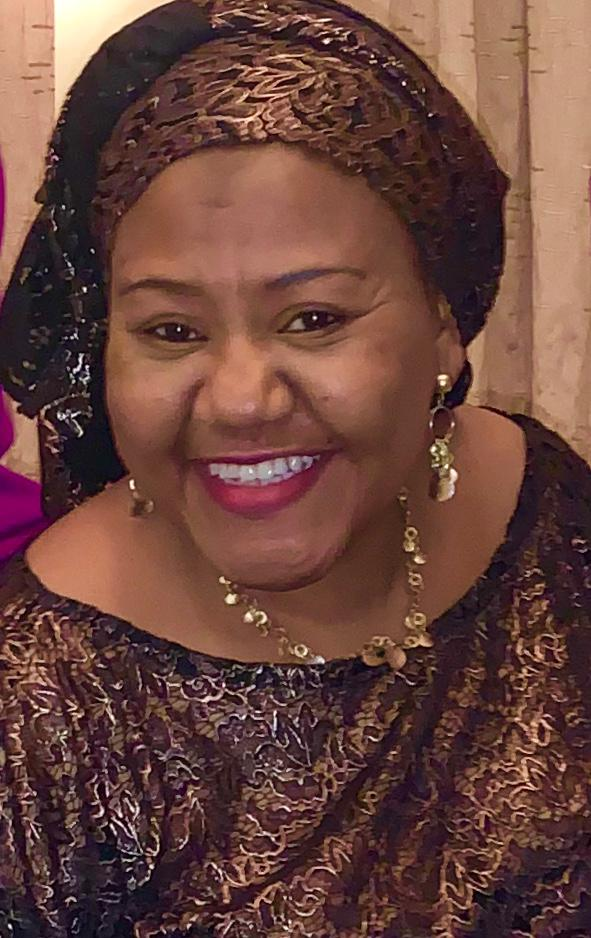

Federal Representative
- Constituency: Kano Central Senatorial District

Personal details
- Occupation: Politician

Aisha Ibrahim Dankani is a Nigerian politician and barrister from Kano State.

== Political life ==
In 2019, Barr. Aisha Ibrahim Dankani contested for the position of senator representing the Kano Central Senatorial District under the Action Democratic Party. In 2022, she celebrated her 60th birthday, where the governorship candidate of the Action Democratic Party and member of the House of Representatives for Kano Municipal Federal Constituency, Honourable Shaaban Ibrahim Sharada, congratulated her and praised her dedication.
